Jerilyn Lee Brandelius (June 25, 1948 – August 31, 2020)  was an American writer and photographer and was known as the author of The Grateful Dead Family Album.

Early life
Brandelius  was born in La Jolla, California to Dorothy Anne Reid a homemaker and Edwin Carl "Brandy" Brandelius II, a US Marine (Ancestry.com). She was the first of five children. Early on, her parents moved to Detroit, Michigan to help with her great-grandmother toward the end of her life. Brandelius father Edwin "Brandy" is from the first marriage of his fathter Edwin Carl Brandelius (Ancestry.com) who immigrated from Sweden.

Her father's second marriage was to singer and environmental activist Katie Lee.

Career
In 1968, Brandelius began working for Translove Airways Productions at the Hippodrome Ballroom in San Diego which led to her meeting members of the Grateful Dead, Steve Miller Band, Quicksilver Messenger Service, The Velvet Underground, Electric Flag, and more. She had a relationship with Grateful Dead drummer Mickey Hart.

In 1969, Brandelius moved to San Francisco, met music promoter and cultural icon Chet Helms (founder of the Avalon Ballroom and father of San Francisco's 1967 Summer of Love). Brandelius worked for him At the Family Dog Ballroom as a personal assistant until it closed, at which point Brandelius went to work for Pete Marino (close friend of Liberace) at WEA as a production assistant.

Brandelius' photographic archive includes rare images from the Grateful Dead's 1978 tour to Egypt.

In 1989, Brandelius published the book The Grateful Dead Family Album with cover art by Stanley Mouse. The book was originally signed to a small publisher but re-signed and pushed into full production with Warner Bros. following Jerry Garcia's hospitalization and near fatal diabetic coma in 1986.

Television and documentary
Brandelius appears in the 1995 documentary Tie-Died which offers a look at the band and the fans known as "Deadheads".
Brandelius appears in American Experience, a television documentary series aired on PBS, in a 2007 episode titled "Summer of Love".

References

Further reading
The Grateful Dead Family Album, 1989 Warner Books

External links

egyptpage.htm article written by Mickey Hart regarding Egypt tour
Movie Reviews New York Times overview of movie Tie-Died

1948 births
2020 deaths
American photojournalists
American non-fiction writers
Writers from San Francisco
Artists from San Francisco
American women photographers
American women journalists
21st-century American women
Women photojournalists